= Strike Out (game) =

Ball game from Chicago, Illinois

Strike Out (also called Fast-Pitch) is a street game involving a rubber ball that is thrown at a wall against a painted square with an x, usually outdoors with rules similar to baseball. The game originated in the Chicago area and was popular in the 20th century.
